Francis Leigh (fl.1663–1692) was an Irish Jacobite politician.

Leigh was the son of John Leigh of County Kildare. On 22 July 1663, Leigh was appointed Escheator of Leinster by Charles II of England. In 1689 he was elected as a Member of Parliament for Kildare Borough in the short-lived Patriot Parliament summoned by James II of England. James II also appointed him as an assessor of taxation for County Kildare. Following the conclusion of the Williamite War in Ireland, Leigh was attainted in 1691 and forfeited his entire estate.

References

Year of birth unknown
Year of death unknown
17th-century Irish people
Irish Jacobites
Irish MPs 1689
Members of the Parliament of Ireland (pre-1801) for County Kildare constituencies
People convicted under a bill of attainder